Jackie Nese (born January 17, 1997 as Jacquelyn Nese) is an American singer/songwriter, dancer, actor, who was a contestant on American Idol in 2015. Her debut single titled "Lovin' Me Up" was released in 2017 along with the music video. The song was produced by Jimmy Greco and Russ DeSalvo.

Early life and education 
Nese was born on January 17, 1997, in Springfield Township, Union County, New Jersey. She is currently studying at Montclair State University.

References

External links 
 

1997 births
American Idol participants
Living people
Montclair State University alumni
People from Springfield Township, Union County, New Jersey